Farvardin is the Iranian Persian name for the first month of the Solar Hijri calendar, the official calendar of Iran, and corresponds with Aries on the Zodiac. Farvardin has thirty-one days. It is the first month of the spring season (Bahar), and is followed by Ordibehesht. The Afghan Pashto name for it is Wray.

In three out of every four years, Farvardin begins on March 21 and ends on April 20 of the Gregorian calendar. In the remaining years, it begins on March 19 or 22, and ends on April 18 or 21. 

Its associated astrological sign in the tropical zodiac is Aries.

Events 
 25 - 1244 - Assassination of Abraham Lincoln
 3 - 1319 - The Lahore Resolution was enacted by prominent Indian Muslim leaders demanding independence of Muslim majority areas of western British India (later to become Pakistan).
 18 - 1275 - The first Summer Olympic Games of the modern era begins in Athens, Greece, coinciding with the 75th anniversary of the Greek War of Independence.
 24 - 1291 - The British passenger liner RMS Titanic hits an iceberg in the North Atlantic at 23:40 (sinks morning of Farvardin 25th).
 25 - 1326 - Jackie Robinson becomes the first ever African American player in Major League Baseball, breaking a long time color barrier in the history of professional baseball in North America.
 30 - 1374 - Oklahoma City bombing
 18 - 1375 - The 1996 season of Major League Soccer officially commences.
 31 - 1378 - Columbine High School shooting
 26 - 1392 - Two bombs explode near the finish line at the Boston Marathon in Boston, Massachusetts, killing three people and injuring 264 others
 11 - 1401 - Siege of Chernihiv and Battle of Bucha both end in Ukrainian victories

Observances 
 Nowruz 
 Easter Triduum - the three days before the first Sunday on or after the first full moon of Farvardin (Christian observance)
 Maundy Thursday - Thursday on or after the full moon of Farvardin (Christian observance)
 Good Friday - Friday on or after the full moon of Farvardin (Christian observance)
 Holy Saturday - Saturday on or full moon of Farvardin (Christian observance)
 Easter - the first Sunday on or after the first full moon of Farvardin (Christian observance)
 Baháʼí Naw-Rúz - 1 Farvardin (Baháʼí holiday)
 Opening Day - Thursday or Friday of the first or second week of Farvardin (movable, date set by Major League Baseball, falls on the Nowruz period)
 Pakistan Day - 3 Farvardin 
 Feast of the Annunciation, Independence Day (Bangladesh) and Greek Independence Day - 5-6 Farvardin
 Khordad Sal - 6 Farvardin
 April Fools' Day - 11 or 12 Farvardin
 Islamic Republic Day - 12 Farvardin
 Sizdah Be-dar - 13 Farvardin
 Qingming Festival - 15-17 Farvardin
 International Day of Sport for Development and Peace - 17 or 18 Farvardin
 Farvardinegan - 19 Farvardin
 Jackie Robinson Day and One Boston Day- 26 or 27 Farvardin

Births
 27 - 1268 - Charlie Chaplin
 31 - 1268 - Adolf Hitler

Deaths 
 25 - 1244 - Abraham Lincoln, 16th President of the United States
 23 - 1324 - Franklin D. Roosevelt, 32nd President of the United States
 8 - 1348 - Dwight D. Eisenhower, 34th President of the United States
 20 - 1400 - Prince Philip, Duke of Edinburgh

References 

Months of the Iranian calendar